Henegar, Henagar, or Henager may refer to:

Henagar, Alabama -  a city in DeKalb County, Alabama, United States
Stevens–Henager College - a private non-profit college in Ogden, Utah
Henegar House - a historic house in Charleston, Tennessee
Henegar Center -  a historic U.S. building in Melbourne, Florida